The S-Bahn Oberösterreich is an S-Bahn system that was introduced on 11 December 2016 in the Greater Linz area of the Austrian state of Upper Austria. In the first step a standardization of the timetable was implemented with exactly the same departure minutes and closure of clock gaps as well as the introduction of the following line names:

Future plans 
The introduction of two more lines is planned:

: Mühlkreisbahn: Linz central station - Rottenegg (route beyond Rottenegg not yet fixed)
: City-Regio-Tram Linz: Linz main station - Gallneukirchen - Pregarten

External links 

 S-Bahn Oberösterreich

References 

S-Bahn in Austria
Upper Austria